The International Journal of Biochemistry & Cell Biology is a monthly peer-reviewed scientific journal published by Elsevier, covering research in all areas of biochemistry and cell biology. The editor-in-chief is Geoffrey J. Laurent (University of Western Australia). The journal was established in 1970 as International Journal of Biochemistry and obtained its current title in 1995.

Abstracting and indexing 
The journal is abstracted and indexed in:

According to the Journal Citation Reports, the journal has a 2013 impact factor of 4.240.

References

External links
 

Publications established in 1970
Biochemistry journals
Monthly journals
English-language journals
Elsevier academic journals